Cullen Benjamin Bailey (born 26 February 1985 in Bedford Park, Adelaide) is a former Australian First Class cricketer. He is a leg-spin bowler, who represented South Australia in the Ryobi Cup and Sheffield Shield, the Australian domestic cricket competitions.

He played for Glenelg in the Adelaide Grade Cricket competition, having previously captained Sturt where he won a premiership in his last year at the club in 2009/10. In 2012/13, he captained Glenelg to their first premiership in 39 years. Along with former South Australian spinner Dan Cullen, Bailey attended Westminster School in Adelaide where he was coached by Kim Harris, former assistant coach of South Australia. Bailey had been coached by Terry Jenner, the man who advised Shane Warne, and was thought to be a prospect to be the leg-spinner to follow the likes of Warne and Stuart MacGill into the Australian cricket team. He was given a national contract but did not represent Australia.

Post-retirement life

After retiring from cricket, Bailey now works in media management, and was chief of staff for Environment and Water Minister David Speirs.

See also
 List of South Australian representative cricketers

References

1985 births
Australian cricketers
South Australia cricketers
Living people
People educated at Westminster School, Adelaide
Cricketers from Adelaide